P-Square is a Nigerian music duo consisting of the twin brothers Peter Okoye and Paul Okoye. They produced and released their albums through Square Records (now Square Root Entertainment)

In December 2011, they signed a record deal with Akon's Konvict Muzik label. In May 2012, P-Square signed a record distribution deal with Universal Music South Africa. On 25 September 2017, numerous media outlets reported that the group disbanded. Reports about a breakup surfaced after Peter reportedly sent a termination letter to the group's lawyer. Prior to this report, the duo disbanded in 2016, supposedly over a disagreement about the role of their manager.

On 17 November 2021, the duo ended their long time feud and reconciled. On 21 July 2022, P-Square released the singles "Jaiye (Ihe Geme)" and "Find Somebody".

History 
The twins Peter and Paul Okoye were born on 18 November, 1981 in Anambra State, Nigeria. Their parents are Mrs Josephine Okoye and Pa Moses Okoye. The twin siblings are Jude, Mary, Tony, Lilian and Ifeanyi Okoye.

They later formed an a cappella quartet called "MMMPP" (M Clef a.k.a. Itemoh, Michael, Melvin, Peter and Paul). Drawing inspiration from their music idol Michael Jackson, they began break dancing, formed the group called "Smooth Criminals" in 1997. They dropped M Clef from the group "MMMPP" which later was changed to "MMPP". Their artistic talent and precise dance routine soon made them household names in the city of Jos, where they performed at school functions and other occasions.

Later in 1999, Peter and Paul returned to music school to develop their skills on the keyboard, drums, bass and rhythm guitar. Their work includes the soundtracks for a number of films like Tobi, Mama Sunday, Moment of Bitterness and Evas River.

Later in 1999, they applied to the University of Abuja to study Business administration. The Smooth Criminals disbanded when its members left to various other universities. Subsequently, Peter and Paul formed their own group, variously called "Double P", "P&P", and "Da Pees", until they eventually settled on "P Square". They were managed by Bayo Odusami aka Howie T, a seasoned concert promoter and the CEO of Adrot Nigeria Limited.

In 2001, "P-Square" won the "Grab Da Mic" competition, and hence Benson & Hedges sponsored their debut album, titled Last Nite, which was released under Timbuk2 music label. P-Square was also nominated as "Most Promising African Group" in the Kora Awards three months after the release of their debut album. They eventually won the 2003 Amen Award for "Best R&B Group".

In 2005, they released their second album, Get Squared under their own label, Square Records. This album was marketed nationwide by TJoe Enterprises, although they were still managed by Howie T of Adrot Nigeria Limited. The video for the second album held the No. 1 position on the MTV Base chart for four straight weeks.

The group performed with artists like Ginuwine, Sean Paul and Akon.

Late in 2007, they released their best selling album so far, Game Over, which sold 8 million copies worldwide.

In 2009, P-Square released their fourth studio album, Danger. The album features collaborations with 2 Face Idibia, J Martins and Frenzy. The first single called "Danger" is a hip hop song with cutting synths and a frog bass baseline similar to an Eminem song. The video affirms this with the presence of clowns and staggered movements in front of the camera reminiscent of comical videos by Eminem. They are also known for the close resemblance which the twins have to American R&B singer, Usher Raymond.

On 4 April 2010, P-Square were named the Artist of the Year at the Kora Awards in Ouagadougou, Burkina-Faso while they were in London for a concert at the Troxy, and they will receive a sum of $1 Million Dollars as the award winners, in Ebebiyin City.

On 29 August 2014, P-Square released a single track featuring a top American Artist T.I. which P-Square titled Ejeajo produced and co-written by VTEK, EjeAjo official video featuring T.I. was also released 29 August 2014 on both TV stations, Radio Stations and Web blogs.
On 14 September 2014 P-Square released their 6th studio album titled Double Trouble . On 8 October 2015 P-Square were given Range Rover SUVs from Globacom as Glo Ambassadors for their sponsorship of the #DanceWithPeter TV Radio entertainment programme. The programme brings dancers from around the world to showcase their talents for prizes.

On 24 February 2016 News of how Globacom decided not to renew its Ambassadorship deal with the duo, albeit renewing the contract with other Ambassadors hit the news. This was as a result of a fallout between the company's representatives and Peter, one half of the P-Square twins during the grand finale of the Dance with Peter talent hunt show.

Controversy 
The duo were reported to have handled most of their production/beat making in house. The band has been faced with many controversies for their habit of sampling western songs and popular hits in their records. They have addressed the issue many times in interviews as well as in the lyrics of their songs. Technically speaking, P Square does more in the line of reconstructing the drum patterns, chord progressions or lyrics of the sampled songs as against actually cutting parts of the song and directly sampling into their production. This accounts for the largely electronic feel of their sound.

Some of the songs which have been called up on this account include "Get Squared", "Game Over", "Danger" and others.

P-Square attracted headlines because they reportedly turned irate when they were notified by organisers in the middle of their performance at the Guinness Show about some change in plans which would affect the length of their performance, and that of the next act, 2 Face Idibia. As reported by a news site vanguardngr.com, the info apparently stirred up resentment as Peter immediately said "I don't know why, anytime a foreign artiste comes to Nigeria, they (show organizers) wanna treat us like slaves in our country". Although initially they continued their performance but midway through, they threw their microphones to the ground and angrily stormed out of the stage saying, "We are leaving; they don't want 2face to come on stage."
They were said to have immediately left the premises of the show, but after intervention of the show organisers, they came on stage later with 2face for a performance, but later on received an apology.

The duo had a difference in opinion regarding what Peter perceived as a lopsidedness in individual input of songs which was getting featured on their joint albums with Paul getting a lion share of his songs selected. This led to Peter refusing to do anything associated with the name "P-Square" for weeks. He later relocated with his wife and kids from the mansion they shared. A lawyer was involved to help split their fortune as they were both involved in joint ventures over the prior years.

The brothers ultimately reconciled publicly on 17 November 2021, when they both hugged and shook hands at Peter Okoye's home in Lagos. Peter's wife and the duo's older brother, Jude Okoye were also present and hugged each other as well.

Personal lives 
After dating for seven years, Peter Okoye got engaged to his longtime girlfriend, Titilola Loretta Omotayo. Omotayo is a marketing representative. The couple are already parents to son Cameron and daughter Aliona. On 17 November 2013, the two held their traditional wedding at The Ark in Lekki, Lagos, Nigeria. Public figures who attended the wedding include Aliko Dangote, Emmanuel Adebayor, Kate Henshaw, Genevieve Nnaji, Rukky Sanda, Folorunsho Alakija, May D, Toke Makinwa, Dr SID, Don Jazzy, and Karen Igho among others.

Paul Okoye met Anita Isama in 2004 while attending the University of Abuja. Their son Andre was born 11 April 2013 in Atlanta, Georgia, United States. The couple married on Saturday, 22 March 2014 at the Aztech Arcum Events Centre in Port Harcourt.

In January 2014, the Okoye brothers bought mansions next door to one another in Atlanta. The duo has gone solo and Peter Okoye now performing as Mr.P while Paul Okoye performs as Rude boy or King Rudy.

On 27 June 2020, Peter Okoye opened up in a video on his Instagram page how he and his wife contracted COVID-19. He then urged people to adhere to safety precautions highlighted by the Nigeria Centre for Disease Control, NCDC, to be safe from the COVID-19 pandemic.

Discography

Studio albums 
Last Nite (2003)
Get Squared (2005)
Game Over (2007)
Danger (2009)
The Invasion (2011)
Double Trouble (2014)

Compilation albums 
Greatest Hits (2013)

International singles

Awards and nominations 

MTV Europe Music Awards

|-
||2013
||P-Square
|"Best African Act"
|
|-
||2015
||P-Square
|"Artist of the Decade"
|
|-
||2015
||P-Square
|"Best Group"
|
|-

Soul Train Music Awards

|-
||2013
||"Personally"
|"Best International Performance"
|

The Headies

|-
| rowspan="5" | 2006
| rowspan="2" |Get Squared
| "Best R&B/Pop Album"
| 
|-
| "Album of the Year"
| 
|-
||"Get Squared"
| "Best Music Video"
| 
|-
||"Bizzy Body"
|"Song of the Year"
| 
|-
||P-Square
|"Artiste of the Year"
| 
|-

City Mag 9th Awards Show

|-
| rowspan="2" | 2006
| rowspan="2" |P-Square
| "Best Hip Hop Group"
| 

Nigerian Music Awards (NMA)

|-
| rowspan="3" | 2006
||Get Squared
| "Album of the Year"
| 
|-
||"Get Squared"
| "Music Video of the Year"
| 

Channel O Music Video Awards

|-
|| 2007
||P-Square
| "Best Duo or Group"
| 
|-
| rowspan="2" | 2008
||P-Square
| "Best Duo or Group"
| 
|-
||"Do Me"
| "Video of the Year"
| 
|-
|| 2012
||P-Square
| "Most Gifted Group of the Year"
| 
|-
| rowspan="2" | 2013
| rowspan="2" |"Alingo"
| "Most Gifted African (West) Video"
| 
|-
| "Most Gifted Video of the Year"
|

MTV Africa Music Awards

|-
| rowspan="4" | 2008
||P-Square
| "Best Group"
| 
|-
||P-Square
| "Artist of the Year"
| 
|-
||P-Square
| "Best R&B"
| 
|-
||"Roll It"
| "Best Video"
| 
|-
| rowspan="2" | 2009
||P-Square
| "Best Group"
| 
|-
||P-Square
| "Best Live Performer"
| 
|-
|rowspan="3"|2014
|rowspan="2"|P-Square
|Best Group
|
|-
|Artist of the Year
|
|-
|"Personally"
|Song of the Year
|

KORA Awards

|-
|| 2003
||P-Square
| "Most Promising African Group"
| 
|-
|| 2010
||P-Square
| "Artiste of the Year"
| 

Lil Perry Productions

|-
|| 2010
||P-Square
| "Producer of the Year"
| 

MOBO Awards

|-
|| 2006
||P-Square
| "Best African Act"
| 
|-
|| 2008
||P-Square
| "Best African Act"
| 
|-
|| 2010
||P-Square
| "Best African Act"
| 
|-
||2012
||P-Square
| "Best African Act"
| 

BET Awards

|-
|| 2010
||P-Square
| "Best International Act"
| 

Ghana Music Awards

|-
|2014
|rowspan="2"|P-Square
|rowspan="2"|"African Artiste of the Year"
|
|-
|2013
|

References 

Sibling musical duos
Nigerian hip hop singers
Identical twins
Nigerian contemporary R&B musical groups
Living people
Igbo-language singers
1981 births
Nigerian twins
Twin musicians
Musical groups established in 2003
21st-century Nigerian male singers
The Headies winners
Nigerian music industry executives
Nigerian musical duos
Nigerian boy bands